The Longtang Dam (龙塘大坝), also known as Longtang Reservoir and Nandu River Dam, is located on the Nandu River at Longtang, Hainan, China.

When the water level is low enough this concrete dam serves as a river crossing for vehicles and pedestrians. The dam has a normal water level of 7.7 metres. At 11.5 metres, an alert is issued. When the dam is closed, large metal doors are lowered at each end to prevent access.

The dam also has hydro electric stations on both banks.

Nandu River Hydro Station
The Nandu River Hydro Station consists of a power generation station on the east and west bank, both operational.

West Hydro Station

The west station's head race is essentially a concrete wall within the river that diverts some water to the station. The station has five, small generators.

East Hydro Station

Planning for the East Hydro Station started in 1998. Work began in 2001, and in November 2011, it began operating.

The station receives water from a head race that runs along the east side of the river for approximately 200 metres. Water enters the turbine, which is the Chongqing-made GZ SK115-WP-275. The SFG2500-40/2860 generator can receive a 5.5-metre intake of head water at a rate of 54.8 cubic metres per second. It is attached to speed monitor model PWST-100-4. This system is mostly automated and can be managed and monitored from the central control office located on the western bank of the Nandu. The generator's output capacity is 5,000 kW (2 x 2,400 kW / 6.3 kV).

This station is a Haikou Water project, and is under the supervision of the Haikou Nandu River Water Diversion Project.

2016 high water level

At 12:00, August 19, 2016, after  Tropical Storm Dianmu brought heavy rains, the water level at the dam reached 13.35 metres, a ten-year high. This prompted a yellow alert indicating that water levels for the Nandu River downstream of the dam would be around two metres higher than normal.

References

,
Dams in China
Road bridges in China